The Rage is a 2002 Romanian thriller film directed by Radu Muntean, starring Dragoș Bucur and Dorina Chiriac. It tells the story of two street racers who struggle to be able to pay a debt in time. The film premiered in Romanian cinemas on 29 November 2002. It recorded 53,372 admissions in its home country.

Bucur received the Best Actor award from the Romanian Union of Filmmakers.

Cast
 Dragoș Bucur as Luca
 Dorina Chiriac as Mona
 Andi Vasluianu as Felie
 Nicodim Ungureanu as red car driver
 Emilia Dobrin as Luca's mother
 Adrian Minune as Adrian Wonderkid
 Bogdan Uritescu as Suca

References

2002 thriller films
2002 films
Films directed by Radu Muntean
Romanian thriller films
2000s Romanian-language films